Arun Icecreams is an Indian ice cream brand owned by Hatsun Agro Product, Tamil Nadu.

History
Arun Icecreams was started by Mr. R.G.Chandramogan in 1970.In 1985, the brand topped the ice cream sales in terms of volume list, in Tamil Nadu. 

By 1999, around 700 outlets were present in Tamil Nadu, Karnataka, Kerala and Andhra Pradesh, and 2,300 parlors as of 2018,  and the brand extended to Maharashtra and Orissa.

See also

 List of ice cream brands

References

External links
 
 Owner website

Ice cream brands
Indian brands
Companies based in Chennai
1970 establishments in Tamil Nadu
Indian companies established in 1970